The 15th International 500-Mile Sweepstakes Race was held at the Indianapolis Motor Speedway on Monday, May 30, 1927.

First-time starter George Souders won by eight laps, the largest margin since 1913. Souders became the first driver to win the full-500 mile race solo, with neither help from a relief driver, nor accompanied by a riding mechanic.

Time trials 
Four-lap (10 mile) qualifying runs were utilized. Frank Lockhart won the pole position with a speed of 120.10 mph. Lockhart set a new 1-lap track record on his final lap.

For the first time, all 33 qualifiers exceeded 100 mph for average speed.

Race summary and results 

At the start, polesitter Lockhart took the lead and dominated the first half of the race. At the halfway point, he had won almost $10,000 in lap prize money. But on lap 120, his Miller broke a connecting rod, and he was out of the race. He reportedly stepped out, shrugged, smiled, and asked for a hot dog.

After Lockhart's retirement, Pete DePaolo took the lead, driving in relief for Bob McDonogh after his own car dropped out. But a supercharger problem required an extended, unscheduled pit stop to repair. With 60 laps to go, George Souders first took the lead. He steadily pulled away from Babe Stapp, both in Duesenbergs, and cruised to victory by over 12 minutes. Stapp, on his way to second place, broke a rear axle with a lap and a half to go, and finished out of the top-10.

Race details 

For 1927, riding mechanics were optional; however, no teams utilized them.

Eddie Hearne was the only driver in the field who had competed at the inaugural Indy 500. This would be the final time a driver from the inaugural race would compete.

References 

Indianapolis 500 races
Indianapolis 500
Indianapolis 500
Indianapolis 500
Indianapolis 500